Prem Nagar  is a Hindi language film. It was released in 1940. According to the opening credits of the film, Prem Nagar is "a small, happy and contented village somewhere in India. A tiny spark of anger flared up a misunderstanding, a quarrel, jealousy, and greed: So grew envy. This envy burst out into a flame and the flame nearly destroyed the whole village."

Cast
 Husna Banu as Maya
 Bimla Kumari as Malati
 Prof. Ramanand as Madhav
 Rai Mohan as Chandu
 Fatty Prasad as Mukhi
 Nagendra as Shankar
 Girish as Inspector
 Sheil Prabha as Barfi
 Gulzar as Gangi
 Salu as Basiba

Soundtrack

The music of the film was composed by Naushad.

References

External links
 

1940 films
1940s Hindi-language films
Indian romance films
1940s romance films
Indian black-and-white films
Hindi-language romance films